Mich Hedin Hansen (born 9 April 1968), known professionally as Cutfather, is a Danish music producer, songwriter, remixer and DJ based in Copenhagen.  Cutfather has a studio on Njalsgade, Copenhagen.

Career
Cutfather is perhaps best known for his remix of "Return of the Mack" by Mark Morrison (1996), and the song "Superstar" recorded by Christine Milton (2002) and Jamelia (2003).

Cutfather has previously worked with Joe Belmaati in the songwriting and production team Cutfather & Joe. As part of the Cutfather & Joe partnership, he wrote, produced and remixed for Peter Andre, Another Level, Damage, Lighthouse Family, Ace of Base, Westlife, Blue, Jamelia, Shayne Ward, Lee Ryan, Lemar, Blazin' Squad and Kylie Minogue.
Cutfather has worked with Danish producer Jonas Jeberg. Together they wrote and produced for Pussycat Dolls, Kylie Minogue, Pixie Lott, The Wanted, JLS, Jessica Mauboy, Claire Richards, and Jordin Sparks. In 2004, Cutfather received a prestigious Ivor Novello songwriting award for Best Performing song, for his composition "Superstar" by Jamelia (which he also co-produced), which was the most performed song in the United Kingdom that year.

In 2015, "Up", performed by Olly Murs featuring Demi Lovato, written and produced alongside Daniel Davidsen and Peter Wallevik, became an international hit.

Writing and producing collaborations

Cutfather produced, wrote and remixed songs with his former production partner Joe Belmaati, as Cutfather and Joe.  
Cutfather was one half of the Danish producer team Soulshock & Cutfather in partnership with Carsten Schack (a.k.a. Soulshock).
They founded together the Danish label Soulpower Productions in 1990.
Cutfather regularly collaborates with songwriters worldwide and many other Danish songwriters and producers, including PhD (Peter Wallevik & Daniel Heloy Davidsen), Kasper Larsen, Jacob Ubizz, Jeppe London Bilsby and E&B.

X Factor in Denmark
On 24 September 2010, it was announced that Cutfather would replace Remee in season four of The X Factor in Denmark. He joined returning judge Pernille Rosendahl and former judge Thomas Blachman. Cutfather won in his first season with Sarah Skaalum Jørgensen. After completing the fifth season (his second season), Cutfather left X Factor and was replaced by Anne Linnet.

References

External links
Official website

1968 births
People from Holbæk Municipality
Danish record producers
Danish songwriters
Ivor Novello Award winners
Living people
Remixers